Andy Caldecott (10 August 1964 – 9 January 2006) was an off-road motorcycle racer born in Keith, South Australia. He won the motorcycle division of the Australian Safari Rally four times consecutively (2000–2003) and was a competitor in the Dakar Rally in 2004 (DNF), 2005 (6th), and 2006.

Career
During the 2006 Dakar Rally he won the third stage, but later died from a neck injury sustained in a crash during the ninth stage, 250 km into the 599 km special stage from Nouakchott to Kiffa. His death was the 23rd in the 28 years of the rally.

Even though he pushed himself to the limits he was known for his easygoing manner and humility. Prior to his death he had operated a motorcycle shop in Keith. He was married to wife, Tracey, who was expecting their second child when Caldecott died and with whom he already had a daughter Caitlin of four years of age. A long-term capital investment trust has been set up for the ongoing support and benefit of Caldecott's wife Tracey, and their children.

Tributes and Awards
Prior to Andy going to the 2006 Dakar Rally, a video was done with him where he was discussing the death of another rider. It is titled "Andy Caldecott Memorial Tribute 2006"

The Keith & Districts Motor Cycle Club along with the Keith War Memorial Community Centre Committee decided to erect a Memorial to him and it was opened on 14 August 2011 named the "Andy Caldecott Memorial"

On Saturday 28 November 2015, Motorcycling SA Inc inducted Andy Caldecott into the Motorcycling SA Hall of Fame. With the help of key people from his career and life, a video was put together as a tribute to Andy.

References

External links
The Andy Caldecott Memorial Trust Information about Andy Caldecott and the trust set up for the ongoing support of his family
ABC SE South Australia News News article on Andy Caldecott prior to death
KTM Australia Andy Caldecott returns to 28th Dakar Rally with KTM
Motorcycling Australia News article on his death
Peoples Responses to Andy Caldecotts Death
Andy Caldecott inducted into the Motorcycling SA Hall of Fame A video for Andy Caldecott's induction into the Motorcycling SA Hall of Fame

1964 births
2006 deaths
People from Keith, South Australia
Australian motorcycle racers
Enduro riders
Motorcycle racers who died while racing
Sport deaths in Mauritania
Dakar Rally drivers